Susan Francis Klebold (née Yassenoff; born March 25, 1949) is an American author and activist. She is the mother of Dylan Klebold, one of the perpetrators of the Columbine High School massacre that occurred on April 20, 1999. She is the author of A Mother's Reckoning, a book about the signs she missed of Dylan's mental state.

Klebold was born in Columbus, Ohio, and worked in assistance services for the disabled for many years. She is now involved in suicide prevention and care for people with psychiatric disorders.

Klebold has committed to donating the profits from her book to mental health charities, research, and suicide prevention, toward the goal of helping parents and professionals find more ways to detect and treat signs of mental distress.

In 2017, Klebold held a TED Talk discussing her son's involvement in the Columbine High School massacre where she explains the intersection between suicidal thoughts and homicidal tendencies, and her personal experiences both before and after the shooting.

A 2019 documentary film, American Tragedy: Love Is Not Enough, profiles Klebold's journey from dealing with her son's actions to becoming a mental health advocate.

Biography
Born to Charlotte (née Haugh, 1921–1987) and Milton Rice Yassenoff (1919–1967) in Columbus, Ohio, she was the granddaughter of philanthropist Leo Yassenoff (1893–1971), a prominent member of the Jewish community in Columbus who left his multimillionaire inheritance to charity organizations. Columbus's Jewish Community Center was named after him.

Klebold grew up in Bexley, Ohio, along with her older sister Diane and younger brother Philip. She studied at Knox College in Galesburg, Illinois and went on to go to Ohio State University in 1969, where she met Thomas Ernest Klebold (born April 15, 1947; Toledo, Ohio). The two became engaged, later marrying in July 1971. She later developed interest in working with people with mental disabilities and worked at a psychiatric hospital as a therapeutic arts teacher. In 1975 she earned a master's degree in educational sciences at Cardinal Stritch College in Milwaukee, Wisconsin.

On October 23, 1978, their first child was born; Byron Jacob. Two years later, they moved to Littleton, Colorado, in the Denver Metropolitan Area. Already in Colorado, she worked for Colorado Community College System where she helped disabled and vulnerable people to get into the social market. In September 1981, Dylan was born. He would attend Columbine High School from 1995 until April 20, 1999. The Klebolds reportedly did not tolerate firearms in their house and were considered normal parents, prompting Sue Klebold to state "how ordinary our life before Columbine was."

After the murders at Columbine, the Klebold family issued a statement through their attorney, expressing condolences to the victims families, and in May 1999, she wrote personal letters to both the families of those killed and survivors who were injured, expressing similar sentiments. The Klebold family initially refused to believe Dylan's involvement in the massacre, but in an interview with Andrew Solomon, Sue Klebold stated that "seeing those videos was as traumatic as the original event [...] Everything I had refused to believe was true. Dylan was a willing participant and the massacre was not a spontaneous impulse." Investigators later concluded that Dylan had had depression and suicidal ideation for about two years, although his parents did not find these details until one year after the killings.

In April 2001, the Klebold parents, along with those of Dylan's accomplice Eric Harris, settled a lawsuit with the families of the victims for $1.6 million. After the lawsuits, Klebold's parents met with several of the victims' families. In July 2003, both the Klebold and Harris families testified under oath; their testimonies are sealed until the year 2027 under the National Archives and Records Administration.

In 2001, Sue Klebold was diagnosed with breast cancer, from which she is now in remission. Later on, she had post traumatic stress disorder and panic attacks.

In 2014, Sue and Thomas Klebold divorced after 43 years of marriage, citing differences in how they dealt with grief and that they did not have any common points of view on what had happened.

The Klebold parents avoided the press for the five years that followed the massacre on their attorney's advice, saying they feared they would be misinterpreted, and that they had received death threats. They broke their silence in 2004, speaking to The New York Times and later on for Andrew Solomon's book Far From The Tree. In the latter, she was quoted as saying, "I know it would have been better for the world if Dylan had never been born. But I believe it would not have been better for me."

In 2009, Klebold wrote for Oprah Winfrey's O Magazine, where she repeated that she had no idea that Dylan had been depressed and having suicidal thoughts. Columnist Mike Littwin criticized the essay in an opinion piece in the Denver Post; Littwin said that Klebold's account, while "eloquent", revealed little about Dylan, his and Harris' victims, or the rest of the Klebold family.

In 2016, she published A Mother’s Reckoning: Living in the Aftermath of Tragedy, against her former husband's and son Byron's advice. The memoir ranked second on the New York Times best-seller list and grossed $427,200, which was donated to organizations advocating for suicide prevention, education about violence, and investigation of mental illnesses.

In 2016, Sue Klebold granted her first televised interview, to Diane Sawyer in the ABC 20/20 special, "Silence Broken. A Mother's Reckoning". She told Sawyer: "I think we like to believe that our love and our understanding is protective, and that ‘if anything were wrong with my kids, I would know,’ but I didn't know, and I wasn't able to stop him from hurting other people. I wasn't able to stop his hurting himself and it's very hard to live with that." The reactions to her interview were mixed. Attorney General of Colorado, Cynthia Coffman, said that Klebold's interview could inspire other would-be shooters, and labeled her as "irresponsible". Conversely, Anne Marie Hochhalter, who was paralyzed in the attack, expressed sympathy for Klebold and commended her for committing to use proceeds from the book to help people with mental illness. Patrick Ireland, who was also severely injured during the attack, said that he "prefers to forget the shooters’ names and their families." Survivor Anne Marie Hochhalter further stated later on a Facebook post that she shared a link with Klebold and that she considered the letter written to her in the aftermath of the tragedy by Sue and Tom Klebold as "genuine and personal" compared to what she described was the "cold and robotic" letter by the Harris parents. Hochhalter's father also defended Klebold's decision to speak out, labelling the remarks by Coffman as "ignorant" and "insensitive" because he considers Klebold a "remorseful mother" who wants to raise awareness on mental health.

Sue Klebold also spoke of her connections with the family of Eric Harris, saying she contacts them "occasionally" and said that "no one should ever perceive their silence to be indifference." saying it is "too difficult to make themselves public."

She has also stated that she understands her son's murder–suicide in a different way now, saying that "coming to understand Dylan's death as a suicide opened the door to a new way of thinking for me about everything he had done," adding that, "whatever else he had intended, Dylan had gone to the school to die."

In an interview with British newspaper The Guardian, she differentiated between her son and Harris saying that "they had different brain conditions. I believe Dylan had some kind of a mood disorder. I believe psychopathy is in a different category. [...] I don't want to say someone commits crimes because they have a mental illness – that is not true – but I believe strongly that both Dylan and Eric were victims of their own pathology, just as everyone else was a victim of that pathology." She also stated with Diane Sawyer that "[...] if I had recognized that Dylan was experiencing some real mental distress ... he would not have been there. He would have gotten help."

After featuring in the 2019 documentary American Tragedy, she gave another interview, this time for Katherine Schwarzenegger's book The Gift of Forgiveness.

In July 2021, Klebold appeared on BBC's Storyville, where she told her story, along other American parents whose sons committed school shootings.

References

External links

 A MOTHER'S RECKONING

1949 births
Living people
Activists from Colorado
Activists from Ohio
American memoirists
American people of Russian-Jewish descent
American women memoirists
American health activists
Cardinal Stritch University alumni
Former Lutherans
Knox College (Illinois) alumni
Mental health activists
Ohio State University alumni
People with post-traumatic stress disorder
People from Littleton, Colorado
People from Bexley, Ohio
21st-century American women